Autocausative reflexive signifies that the (usually animated) "referent represented by the subject combines the activity of actor and undergoes a change of state like a patient/subject".

References

Grammar
Transitivity and valency
Verb types